The Algerian National Time Trial Championships is a cycling race where the Algerian cyclists decide who will become the champion for the year to come.

Men

Elite

U23

Junior

See also
Algerian National Road Race Championships
National Road Cycling Championships

National road cycling championships
Cycle races in Algeria
Cycling